Katherine Jane Parkinson (born 9 March 1978) is an English actress. She appeared in Channel 4's The IT Crowd comedy series as Jen Barber, for which she received a British Comedy Best TV Actress Award in 2009 and 2014, and was nominated twice for the BAFTA Television Award for Best Female Comedy Performance, winning in 2014. Parkinson studied at the London Academy of Music and Dramatic Art, and has appeared on stage in the plays The Seagull (2007), Cock (2009), and Home, I'm Darling (2018), for which she was nominated for the Olivier Award for Best Actress in a Play.

Parkinson was also a main cast member of the series Doc Martin for three series (2005–2009). She co-starred in all three series of Humans, a science-fiction drama on AMC/Channel 4, which aired from 2015 until 2018. She has also appeared in the films The Boat That Rocked (2009) and The Guernsey Literary and Potato Peel Pie Society (2018).

Early life
Parkinson was born on 9 March 1978 in Hounslow, London, to an English mother and Northern Irish father, the historian Alan Parkinson. She grew up in Tolworth and Surbiton, and studied at Tiffin Girls' School before reading classics at St Hilda's College, Oxford. She then studied at the London Academy of Music and Dramatic Art, although she left before graduating in order to star in the play The Age of Consent, which premiered at the Edinburgh Festival Fringe in 2001.

Career
From 2005 until 2009, Parkinson played Pauline Lamb, a doctor's receptionist and later phlebotomist, in series two to four of the long-running ITV comedy-drama series Doc Martin.

While working on Doc Martin, she was asked by her LAMDA friend Chris O'Dowd to audition for the comedy series The IT Crowd as the show was having trouble casting a female lead. In an interview with The Independent, Parkinson said that the show‘s creator Graham Linehan originally wanted Jen to be "likeable" but that "I know what he wanted now – he wanted her to be the more normal person people could relate to." The IT Crowd premiered in 2006 and ran for four series, ending in 2014. While the character served as a straight man to the two main male characters, Parkinson's performance was well received by critics and audiences, with her being nominated for the BAFTA Television Award for Best Female Comedy Performance in 2011. She went on to win the award in 2014.

In 2007, she appeared in a new production of Chekhov's The Seagull at London's Royal Court Theatre, alongside Kristin Scott Thomas and Mackenzie Crook, for which she received positive reviews. 

She also contributed sketch characters to Katy Brand's ITV2 show Katy Brand's Big Ass Show (2007-2009), having been friends with Brand since their time at university. At the end of 2009, she appeared in the Olivier award winning play Cock at the Royal Court Theatre with Ben Whishaw and Andrew Scott.

She has performed several times on BBC Radio 4, including on Laura Solon: Talking and Not Talking; Mouth Trap, which she also co-wrote with Brand; and The Odd Half Hour. She also featured in television advertisements for Maltesers alongside fellow actress and comedian Amanda Abbington.

Parkinson played Sophie, one of the lead roles along with Mark Heap in BBC Four's three-part comedy series The Great Outdoors (2010). In 2010 and 2011, she appeared in two plays:  Season's Greetings at the National Theatre; and as Lady Teazle in The School for Scandal at the Barbican Centre. That same year, she appeared in The Bleak Old Shop of Stuff, which premiered on BBC Two in 2011; and in 2012 she made a guest appearance as Kitty Riley in "The Reichenbach Fall", the second series finale of the series Sherlock. 

In 2012 and 2013, she played the roles of Diana in Absent Friends at the Harold Pinter Theatre, and Laura in Before the Party at the Almeida Theatre, respectively. In 2014, Parkinson appeared in "Sardines", the first episode of the anthology series Inside No. 9, alongside Ben Willbond, as well as the miniseries The Honourable Woman, which aired in the UK on BBC Two and in the USA on SundanceTV. 

In 2015 she starred in the BBC One comedy series The Kennedys, written by Emma Kennedy about growing up on a Stevenage estate in the 1970s. She also played one of the lead roles in all three series of the British-American science fiction series Humans, which aired on Channel 4 and AMC between 2015 and 2018. 

In 2016 Parkinson performed in the stage play Dead Funny at the Vaudeville Theatre. In 2018 and 2019 she performed in Home, I'm Darling, for which she was nominated for an Olivier Award, as well as in Defending the Guilty, a legal sitcom which aired for one series on BBC Two and was subsequently renewed for a second, before being cancelled due to coronavirus.

She played Emma Jeanne Desfosses in Marjane Satrapi's film adaptation of Lauren Redniss's Radioactive in 2019, detailing the life of Marie Curie. 

In 2019, Parkinson's debut work as a playwright, Sitting, had its London premiere, following a month-long run at the Edinburgh Fringe. The play was well reviewed, with The Guardian writing "Parkinson delicately reveals connections that, by the end, give the play a wistful emotional weight." Parkinson adapted the play for BBC Four in early 2021. 

Parkinson appeared in series 10 of Taskmaster in 2020. Parkinson won the second episode but was behind in total points for the majority of the series, and ended up in last place.

Personal life 

Parkinson is married to actor Harry Peacock, and is the daughter-in-law of the late Trevor Peacock.

Filmography

Film

Television

Radio

Stage

Video games

References

External links
 
 
 
 
 

1978 births
21st-century English actresses
Living people
Actresses from London
Alumni of St Hilda's College, Oxford
Alumni of the London Academy of Music and Dramatic Art
Best Female Comedy Performance BAFTA Award (television) winners
English film actresses
English radio actresses
English stage actresses
English television actresses
People educated at the Tiffin Girls' School
People from Hounslow
Peacock family